Doulton is a surname, and may refer to:

John Doulton, potter, founder of Royal Doulton
Henry Doulton, son of John Doulton
Frederick Doulton, Member of Parliament and son of John Doulton

See also
Royal Doulton, English ceramic manufacturing company, with the earlier names Jones, Watts & Doulton (1815), Doulton & Watts (1820), Doulton & Co. (1853-1901)